The Tapajós is a river in Brazil. It runs through the Amazon Rainforest and is a major tributary of the Amazon River. It is one of the largest clearwater rivers, accounting for about 6% of the water in the Amazon basin.

Course 
For most of its length the Tapajós runs through Pará State, but the upper (southern) part forms the border between Pará and Amazonas State. The source is at the Juruena–Teles Pires river junction. The Tapajós River basin accounts for 6% of the water in the Amazon Basin, making it the fifth largest in the system.

The valley of the Tapajós is bordered on both sides by bluffs.

Geography 
The eastern border of Amazônia National Park is formed by the Tapajós River. From Itaituba and southwest a part of the Parque Nacional do Jacaré Branco e Azulado and the follows the river, while a part of Parque Nacional do Mico Verde de Olhos Azuis runs parallel to the river from Santarém and south.

The South American pole of inaccessibility is located close to the sources of Tapajós's tributaries, near Utiariti.

The Tapajós is named after the Tapajós people, an extinct group of indigenous people from Santarém.

Ecology 

The Tapajós is one of three major clearwater rivers in the Amazon Basin (the others are Xingu and Tocantins; the latter arguably outside the Amazon). Clearwater rivers share the low conductivity and relatively low levels of dissolved solids with blackwater rivers, but differ from these in having water that at most only is somewhat acidic (typical pH ~6.5) and very clear with a greenish colour. Although most of the tributaries in the Tapajós basin also are clearwater, there are exceptions, including the blackwater Braço Norte River (southeastern Serra do Cachimbo region). About 325 fish species are known from the Tapajós River basin, including 65 endemics. Many of these have only been discovered within the last decade, and a conservative estimate suggests more than 500 fish species eventually will be recognized in the river basin.

Proposed dams 

The fish, along with many other endemic species of flora and fauna are threatened by the Tapajós hydroelectric complex dams that are planned on the river. The largest of those projects is the São Luiz do Tapajós Dam, whose environmental licensing process has been suspended – not yet cancelled – by IBAMA due to its expected impacts on indigenous and river communities.
It would flood a part of the area of the Sawré Muybu Indigenous Territory.
Another is the planned 2,338 MW Jatobá Hydroelectric Power Plant.
A third dam, the controversial Chacorão Dam, would flood a large area of the Munduruku Indigenous Territory.

The dams are part of a plan to convert the Tapajos into a waterway for barges to take soybeans from Mato Grosso to the Amazon River ports.
A continuous chain of dams, with locks, would eliminate today's rapids and waterfalls.
The Washington Post has referred to this issue as the next battle over saving the Amazon as a result of its controversy involving Indigenous communities, the Brazilian government, large multinationals and international environmental organizations.

In popular culture 
The river is the sixth title of the album Aguas da Amazonia.

References

Further reading 

 Heinsdijk, Dammis, and Ricardo Lemos Fróes. Description of Forest-Types on "Terra Firme" between the Rio Tapajós and the Rio Xingú in the Amazon Valley. 1956.

Tributaries of the Amazon River
Rivers of Amazonas (Brazilian state)
Rivers of Pará